Baker Octagon Barn is a historic barn located in Richfield Springs in Otsego County, New York. It was built in 1882, and is a three-story, octagonal wood frame and fieldstone structure.  It has a hipped roof and is topped by an octagonal cupola.  The barn measures 60 feet in diameter.

It is octagonal, which meets the definition of being a round barn.

It was added to the National Register of Historic Places in 1984.

References

Barns on the National Register of Historic Places in New York (state)
Octagon barns in the United States
Round barns in New York (state)
Infrastructure completed in 1882
Buildings and structures in Otsego County, New York
National Register of Historic Places in Otsego County, New York